Surxondaryo Region (UniPers: "sorxāndaryā"), old spelling Surkhandarya Region is a region (viloyat) of Uzbekistan, located in the extreme south-east of the country. Established on March 6, 1941, it borders on Qashqadaryo Region internally, and Turkmenistan, Afghanistan and Tajikistan externally, going anticlockwise from the north. It takes its name from the river Surxondaryo, that flows through the region. It covers an area of 20,100 km². The population is estimated at 2,743,201 (beginning of 2022 data), with 80% living in rural areas. According to official data, 83% of the population are Uzbeks and 12,5% Tajiks, but non-official statistics show Surxondaryo is a Persian-speaking area, because most Tajiks of Uzbekistan are concentrated in the Surxondaryo, Samarkand and Bukhara regions. The highest point of the Region and also of Uzbekistan is Khazrati Sulton peak reaching 4,643 m/15,233 ft in Gissar Range.

The regional capital is Termez (Termiz) with population of 122,900 (2021), and the second largest city is Denov (Denau) with 69,500 inhabitants (data for 2005). Other towns include Boysun, Jarqoʻrgʻon, Qumqoʻrgʻon, Shargʻun, Sherobod, Shoʻrchi, and Sariosiyo.

The climate is continental, with mild wet winters and hot dry summers.  The southern part of the region is in the Badkhiz-Karabil semi-desert ecoregion (PA0808), characterized by a savanna of pistachio and desert sedge.  The northern portion is characterized by open woodlands (Gissaro-Alai open woodlands ecoregion, PA1306), with characteristic plants being pistachio, almond, walnut, apple, and juniper.  Sagebrush is common at lower elevations 

Natural resources include petroleum, natural gas, and coal. Light industry, mainly cotton ginning and food processing, is also an important part of the regional economy, particularly in the production of consumer goods. Agriculture is based primarily on cotton and cereals, supplemented with horticulture and viticulture. Surxondaryo is the country's largest supplier of long-fiber cotton. Livestock accounts for 40% of regional agricultural product. The climatic conditions of this region also make it possible to cultivate subtropical crops such as sugarcane.

The region has a well-developed transport infrastructure, with 300 km of railways and 2,700 km of surfaced roads. Central Asia's only river port is located at Termez on the Amudarya River.

History
Bitter debates accompanied the Soviet allocation of Surkhandarya Region to the Uzbek SSR rather than the Tajik SSR in 1929, as that region, as well as the areas of Bukhara and Samarkand, had sizable, if not dominant, Tajik populations.

Districts

The Surxondaryo Region consists of 14 districts (listed below) and one district-level city: Termez.

There are 8 cities (Termez, Boysun, Denov, Jarqoʻrgʻon, Qumqoʻrgʻon, Shargʻun, Sherobod, Shoʻrchi) and 112 urban-type settlements in the Surxondaryo Region.

Agriculture (2005 data)
Agriculture accounts for 42% of total employment in Surxondaryo Region and produces 8% of Uzbekistan’s agricultural output. Agricultural production is 56% crops and 44% livestock (like the country’s average). Milk yields are less than 1,700 kg per cow per year, on a par with the national average.

Main characteristics of agriculture in Surxondaryo Region

Gallery

References

External links
Map of Surxondaryo Region (Russian).

 
Regions of Uzbekistan